Belyayev (masculine) or Belyayeva (feminine) is a Russian patronymic surname derived from the nickname Belyay/Belyai (Беляй), for white (blond) hair.

The surname may refer to:

People
Alexander Belyaev, Russian author of science fiction
Anatoly Belyayev, Soviet scientist in the field of metallurgy
Dmitry Belyayev (disambiguation), several people
Evgeny Belyaev, Soviet tenor soloist with the Alexandrov Ensemble
Ivan Belyayev (disambiguation), several people
 Maria Rüdiger-Belyaeva mother of John Shalikashvili
Mikhail Belyaev, Russian statesman, military figure, and infantry general
Mitrofan Belyayev, Russian entrepreneur and music publisher
Nikolai Belyaev (1903-1966), Soviet Communist Party leader
Pavel Belyayev, Russian cosmonaut
Sergey Belyayev, Kazakhstani shooter
Spartak Belyaev, Soviet physicist and academician
Vadim Belyaev, Russian banker
Volodymyr Byelyayev, Soviet Olympic gold medalist in volleyball in 1968
Vladimir Belyaev (weightlifter), Soviet Olympic silver medalist in weightlifting in 1968
Vladimir Belyayev (footballer), Soviet international footballer
Vladimir Pavlovich Belyaev, Soviet/Ukrainian writer
Yevgeny Belyayev, Soviet/Russian skier
Yury Belyayev (b. 1947), Russian actor

Other
Belyaev (crater), a lunar crater

See also
Belyayevo

Patronymic surnames
Russian-language surnames